Stephen Lorenzo Varney (born 16 May 2001) is a Welsh-born Italian professional rugby union player who primarily plays scrum-half for Gloucester of the English Premiership. He has also represented Italy at international level, having made his test debut against Scotland during the Autumn Nations Cup. Varney has previously played for clubs such as Hartpury in the past.

Professional career 
Coming from Rhoshill, Pembrokeshire, and having played for Crymych RFC, in 2020 he was named for Italy U20 squad, for which he qualifies through his Italian mother, Valeria.

In January 2020, Varney was named in the Italy Under 20 squad for the 2020 Six Nations Under 20s Championship.

He made his international debut for Italy, from the bench, in the Autumn Nations Cup against Scotland that year.

References

External links 

2001 births
Living people
Gloucester Rugby players
Italian rugby union players
Italy international rugby union players
Rugby union players from Pembrokeshire
Rugby union scrum-halves
Welsh rugby union players